Diamond Box: Wink Best Selection Disc is the first remix album by Japanese idol duo Wink, released by Polystar on December 21, 1991. It features four remixed songs and two medley tracks.

The album peaked at No. 14 on Oricon's albums chart and sold over 65,000 copies.

Track listing 
All lysics are written by Neko Oikawa, except where indicated; all music is arranged by Satoshi Kadokura, except where indicated.

Charts

References

External links 
 
 

1991 remix albums
Wink (duo) compilation albums
Japanese-language remix albums